Ewa Wawrzoń (Poland, 11 May 1937 – 14 April 2021) was a Polish actress.

References

1937 births
2021 deaths
Polish film actresses
Polish stage actresses
Actresses from Kraków
20th-century Polish actresses
21st-century Polish actresses